Fahy may refer to:
 Fahy (surname)
 Fahy, County Mayo, Ireland
 Fahy, is a municipality in Porrentruy, Jura, Switzerland